The Atlético Reynosa Fútbol Club, is a Mexican football club based in the city of Reynosa, Tamaulipas, Mexico. The club was founded on 2012 as Reynosa Fútbol Club, in 2017 was rebranded. Between 2012 and 2020 the team played at Serie A of Liga Premier. From 2020, the team went into hiatus due to financial difficulties and stopped participating in Mexican football indefinitely, but without being dissolved. In 2022 the team's license was sold to C.D.S. Tampico Madero, so any possibility of the return of Atlético Reynosa was eliminated.

History 
The team was established in 2012 with the name Reynosa F.C., at first, the franchise was planned to play in the Ascenso MX, however, it was finally placed in the Liga Premier de Ascenso (third level) because it did not find a place in the second category, the first match of the club was a friendly played on August 14, 2012 against Dorados de Sinaloa. Their first seasons were played at the Estadio Adolfo López Mateos, and later the team started to build a new stadium.

On September 27, 2013, the team's new stadium was inaugurated, located in the Unidad Deportiva Solidaridad.

On June 19, 2017, the Reynosa F.C. It was acquired by new owners who changed their name to Atlético Reynosa, and the colors of the club were changed, from red, green and white to blue and white.

In 2020 the team began the process to join the new Liga de Expansión MX, which became the second league in Mexican football system. However, finally the participation of Atlético Reynosa in the league was rejected due to problems with its stadium and that is why the club had to remain in the Liga Premier de México, after this the team went on hiatus due to financial difficulties caused by the loss of sponsors that would support the club as long as it got a place in Liga de Expansión.

Between 2012 and 2015, the club had a team affiliated in Liga de Nuevos Talentos called Topos de Reynosa, finally it was sold to become Tigrillos de Chetumal.

Season to season

Players

Current squad 
.

Player records

All-time top scorers

Managers 
 Franco Zúñiga Gómez (Apr 2012 – Aug 2012)
 Mario Pérez Guadarrama (Aug 2012 – Nov 2012)
 Franco Zúñiga Gómez (Nov 2012 – Nov 2013)
 Cristóbal Cubilla Delgadillo (Nov 2013 – Mar 2014)
 Rubén Alejandro Tanucci (Mar 2014 – Apr 2014)
 Carlos Reinoso, Jr. (Apr 2014 – Sep 2014)
 Ramón Villa Zevallos (Sep 2014 – Jul 2017)
 Esteban Mejía (Jul 2017 – Jul 2018)
 Alejandro Pérez Macías (Jul 2018 – Jun 2019)
 Gastón Obledo (Jul 2019 – Jun 2020)

References

External links 
 

Football clubs in Tamaulipas
Reynosa
Liga Premier de México
Association football clubs established in 2012
2012 establishments in Mexico